Elections to the Supreme Soviet of the Estonian SSR were held on 25 February 1951. The Bloc of Communists and Non-Party Candidates was the only party able to contest the elections, and won all 115 seats.  Elected members included Joseph Stalin (Tallinn constituency no. 3), Vyacheslav Molotov (Tallinn constituency no. 18), Georgi Malenkov (Tallinn constituency no. 12) and Panteleimon Ponomarenko (Tallinn constituency no. 4).

Results

See also
List of members of the Supreme Soviet of the Estonian Soviet Socialist Republic, 1951–1955

References

Estonia
Single-candidate elections
One-party elections
1951 in Estonia
Parliamentary elections in Estonia
Estonian Soviet Socialist Republic